Juan Matías Etchegoyen is an Argentine footballer who plays as a midfielder for Greek side PAS KORINTHOS

Personal life 
Born in Florida, Argentina, Etchegoyen also holds Italian citizenship.

Career 
Etchegoyen went through the youth ranks with local side Club Atlético Acassuso and later broke into the first team in 2016. After two years with the Acassuso first-team, Etchegoyen moved to Italy, joining Varese.

He only spent a year in Italy before moving back to South America to join Venezuelan side Metropolitanos in 2019. He made 23 appearances picking up 13 yellow cards during his time in Venezuela.

In January 2020, he joined Gibraltar Premier Division side Mons Calpe but only made 3 appearances due to the ongoing COVID-19 pandemic in Europe, he left at the end of the season.

In October 2020, Etchegoyen joined Cymru Premier side Aberystwyth Town.

References

External links

1995 births
Living people
Aberystwyth Town F.C. players
Argentine footballers
Argentine expatriate footballers
Expatriate footballers in Venezuela
Expatriate footballers in Gibraltar
Expatriate footballers in Wales
Metropolitanos FC players
Club Atlético Acassuso footballers
Association football midfielders
A.C.D. Sant'Angelo 1907 players